Blaž Kavčič (born 3 October 1951 in Ljubljana) is a Slovenian politician and economist.

From 2007 to 2012, Kavčič was president of the National Council (Slovenian: Državni svet). He was elected to the council by electors of the Kranj part of Upper Carniola in November 2007.

He lives with his family in Forme, Škofja Loka municipality.

References

1951 births
Living people
Politicians from Ljubljana
20th-century Slovenian economists
Presidents of the National Council (Slovenia)
Yugoslav economists